Post Lake is an unincorporated community and census-designated place (CDP) in the town of Elcho, Langlade County, Wisconsin, United States. As of the 2010 census, its population was 374.

References

Census-designated places in Langlade County, Wisconsin
Census-designated places in Wisconsin